Aasutosh Panigrahi is an artist and a Guinness World Record holder. He presently holds the record for World's Largest Indoor Mural. The award was acknowledged by Guinness World Records in August 2005.

The largest indoor mural measures 904 m2 (9,731 ft²) & was painted by six artists from 27 February to 5 March 2005 at Shyam Vatika, Gwalior, India. The painting was coordinated by Panigrahi and the owners of Shyam Vatika: R P Maheshwary and Ankur Maheshwary, with the sole purpose of setting a World Record. The art features on all interior walls and ceilings of the privately owned Auditorium Shyam Vatika.

The Largest Indoor Mural in the world

References

External links
 General reference
 Web Site:  Shyam Vatika

Living people
Year of birth missing (living people)
Indian muralists